The Nha Trang Oceanography Institute or Institute of Oceanography in Nha Trang is an oceanography institute located at 1 Cau Da St., next to Cau Da Wharf, about 6 km from the center of Nha Trang, Khánh Hòa Province, Vietnam. Established in 1923, it was one of the first centers for scientific research in Vietnam and is an important location for tropical oceanographic research.  Since the establishment, the center has published approximately 1,100 scientific studies comprising 62.6% about marine biodiversity, 11.6% about marine physics, 7.6% about ecology and environment; 5.4% about marine geology, and 4.4% about marine chemistry and biochemistry 

The Marine Animal Museum is located in the vicinity which has more than 20,000 sea and freshwater creatures.

References

Research institutes in Vietnam
Buildings and structures in Khánh Hòa province
Nha Trang
Oceanographic organizations
Organizations established in 1923
1923 establishments in Vietnam
Tourist attractions in Khánh Hòa province